Direct impingement is a type of gas operation for a firearm that directs gas from a fired cartridge indirectly (through the barrel, through a gas block, and then through a gas tube) into the bolt carrier or slide assembly to cycle the action. Firearms using direct impingement are theoretically lighter, more accurate, and less expensive than firearms using cleaner and cooler gas piston systems.

Advantages 
Firearms featuring a direct impingement design are, in principle, capable of being constructed so as to be slightly lighter than their piston operated counterparts (due to the lack of any additional hardware other than the gas tube, which is required to channel the gas from the barrel back towards the action). Unlike conventional gas-operated firearms, direct impingement does away with a separate gas cylinder, piston, and operating rod assembly. High-pressure gas acts directly upon the bolt and carrier, thereby saving weight, lowering manufacturing costs, and reducing the mass of the operating parts, and thereby the wear on mechanical parts due to movement. By removing the gas piston, the potential amount of moving mass is lowered, thus decreasing the potential for firearm movement and barrel distortion before the bullet leaves the barrel.

In the AR-10 and AR-15 designs, the gas directed out of the bolt carrier group may improve reliability in some conditions. The jet of gas can blow debris away from the ejection port, preventing ingress of material which, in other designs, would infiltrate the mechanism and foul the gun.

Disadvantages 
The main disadvantage of direct impingement is that the breech of the firearm's firing mechanism becomes fouled more quickly than long or short stroke piston firearms by direct exposure of the impinging region of the bolt carrier to the residues of the burned cartridge propellant each time the firearm cycles. This is caused by particles suspended in high-temperature gas condensing on the bolt face and primary operating mechanism. The combustion gases contain vaporized metals, carbon, and impurities in a gaseous state until they contact the relatively cooler operating parts. These deposits increase friction on the bolt's camming system, leading to malfunctions, so that frequent and thorough cleaning is required to ensure reliability.  The amount of fouling depends upon the rifle's design as well as the type of propellant powder used.

A further disadvantage of direct impingement is that combustion gases heat the bolt and bolt carrier as the firearm operates. This heating causes essential lubricant to be "burned off". Lack of proper lubrication is the most common cause of weapon malfunctions. These combined factors reduce service life of these parts, reliability, and mean time between failures.

Variables 
The operation of the system is highly dependent on the length of both barrel and gas tube which transports gas from the barrel to the bolt. Using too short a gas tube can result in increased pressure inside the bolt assembly and increased rate of automatic fire, both of which can have detrimental effect on the weapon and accuracy of shots. The use of a suppressor also increases gas pressure, further aggravating the situation. The problem can be reduced by using a longer gas tube, moving the gas port on the barrel further forward, and/or by installing an adjustable gas block to provide the right amount of gas pressure depending on the desired operating mode.

History
The first experimental rifle using a direct impingement system was the French Rossignol ENT B1 automatic rifle followed by Rossignol's B2, B4 and B5. The first successful production weapon was the MAS 40 rifle adopted in March 1940. The Swedish Automatgevär m/42 is another well-known example. Both the French and Swedish rifles use a simple system whereby the gas tube acts as a piston with a cylinder recess in the bolt carrier.

Stoner bolt and carrier piston system

A widely known direct impingement gas system is the one used in the AR-15 style rifle, first patented by ArmaLite for use in the AR-10. The original AR-10 action (later developed into the ArmaLite AR-15, M16 rifle and M4 carbine) designed by Eugene Stoner is commonly called a direct impingement system, but it does not utilize a conventional direct impingement system. In , the designer states: ″This invention is a true expanding gas system instead of the conventional impinging gas system.″ Gas is routed from a port in the barrel through a gas tube, directly to a chamber inside the bolt carrier. The bolt within the bolt carrier is fitted with piston rings to contain the gas. In effect, the bolt and carrier act as a gas piston and cylinder. The subtleties involved in ArmaLite's patent on the gas system significantly diverge from classical direct impingement; upon firing, the pressurized propellant gasses exit the barrel via the gas port and travel the length of the gas tube, but instead of simply applying the inertia necessary to cycle the weapon directly to the bolt carrier, the gas is funneled inside the bolt carrier wherein the increase in pressure results in the bolt itself acting as a piston, forcing the bolt carrier away from the barrel face.

See also
Glossary of firearms terminology
Gas-delayed blowback
Repeating rifle

References

Sources
 Centre des archives de l'armement, Châtellerault. National Armament Archives Center.
 Huon, Jean. Proud Promise—French Semiautomatic Rifles: 1898-1979, Collector Grade Publications,1995,
 United States Patent Office, Patent No. 2951424 - Gas Operated Bolt and Carrier System, Sep 6 1960.

External links
How Does It Work: Direct Gas Impingement Forgotten Weapons

Firearm actions